Elwes is an English surname whose spelling over the years has included Helwish, Helewise, Helwys, Elwaiss, Elwaies and Elway. It may refer to:

 Columba Cary-Elwes (1903–1994), English Benedictine monk
 Elwes baronets, 1660–1787
 Eva Elwes (1876-1950), English actor and playwright
 Sir Gervase Elwes, 1st Baronet (1628–1706)
 Gervase Elwes, junior politician
 Gervase Elwes (1866–1921), English singer; father of Simon
 Simon Elwes (1902–1975), English artist; father of Dominick
 Dominick Elwes (1931–1975), English artist; 3 sons listed below
 Cassian Elwes (born 1959), English independent film producer
 Damian Elwes (born 1960), English artist
 Cary Elwes (born 1962), English actor
 Henry John Elwes (1846–1922) English botanist and plant-collector
 John Elwes (politician) (1714–1789), grandson of Sir Gervase (born Meggot)
 John Elwes (tenor) (born 1946), English singer
 Luke Elwes (born 1961), English artist
 Jake Elwes (born 1993), English media artist
 Polly Elwes (1928–1987), English television reporter and presenter
 Richard Elwes (1901-1968), English barrister and High Court judge
 Robert Elwes (British Army officer) (1856–1881), English soldier
 Robert Elwes (painter) (1818–1878), English traveller and painter

Several of these, including Gervase Elwes, were of the Cary-Elwes branch of the family, but chose not to use a hyphenated name.

English-language surnames